Signs of Life, also known as One for Sorrow, Two for Joy, is a film by American director John David Coles, released May 5, 1989. It stars Beau Bridges, Vincent D'Onofrio, and Arthur Kennedy (in his last  film appearance). Kathy Bates, Mary-Louise Parker (in her film debut), Will Patton, and Kate Reid also are featured.

Plot
Signs of Life is the story of a Maine man who is losing his boat and his business.

Cast
 Beau Bridges as John Alder
 Vincent D'Onofrio as Daryl Monahan
 Arthur Kennedy as Owen Coughlin
 Kevin J. O'Connor as Eddie Johnson
 Will Patton as Owen's Dad
 Kate Reid as Mrs. Wrangway
 Georgia Engel as Betty
 Kathy Bates as Mary Beth Alder
 Mary-Louise Parker as Charlotte

Production
Signs of Life was filmed in various small-town locations in Maine, with the exception of an underwater sequence filmed at Mystic Marine Aquarium in Mystic, Connecticut.

Reception
The film earned director Coles a Deauville Film Festival award, but was a financial loss.

External links

 
 

1989 films
1989 drama films
1989 independent films
American drama films
American independent films
Films scored by Howard Shore
Films shot in Maine
Films set in Maine
1989 directorial debut films
1980s English-language films
1980s American films